Carlos Callejas (born September 17, 1985 in Granada, Nicaragua) better known as Torombolo is a reggaeton and hip hop singer with "Camillion Entertainment Latino".

Early life
Torombolo grew up in Granada, Nicaragua mainly raised by his mother. At the age of 11 he, along with his family, moved to the San Francisco Bay Area in California. At the age of 16 Carlos decided to start his own project, he began making rap and reggaeton, being the second genre he knew well and along with other members of Camillion Ent. invented their own style of music called "Bayggeaton", which mixed reggaeton with elements identified in Bay Area music.

2007: Calibre
Torombolo's debut album, Calibre, was released in April 2007. It is Torombolo's first CD, which he named after his home state of California, he respectfully added "libre" (free) and created the name for the album, Calibre. The CD contains 15 tracks features singles such as California, Triquitraca, and Nuevo Ritmo which can be heard on the radio internationally. Calibre also features collaborations with other local Bay Area artist such as Dego and also Catracho on Tu Idolo, and Loco.

The songs on the CD reflect Torombolo's style of "Bayggeaton", a style of music which he invented along with members of Camillion Ent. Bayggeaton is reggaeton mixed elements usually found in local Bay Area music.

Discography
Cammilion Ent. Mixtape (2006)
Calibre (2007)

See also
 Music of Nicaragua

References

External links
Torombolo's Official Myspace

ToromBolo
ToromBolo
ToromBolo
Nicaraguan reggaeton musicians
21st-century American singers
21st-century American male singers